New Liskeard station is a former railway station in the community of New Liskeard, in Temiskaming Shores, Timiskaming District, Northeastern Ontario, Canada. It is located on the north end of Jaffray Street, across from the west entrance of Spruce Avenue.

It was a station stop for Northlander trains of Ontario Northland before service was discontinued in 2012. It was then used as an Ontario Northland bus station until March 4, 2016.

References

External links
ONR - New Liskeard Station

Ontario Northland Railway stations
Railway stations in Canada opened in 1906
Transport in Temiskaming Shores
Railway stations in Timiskaming District
Disused railway stations in Canada